Christian Church and Parsonage is a historic church and parsonage in Plantersville, Alabama.  Both the church and the parsonage were built in 1898. The pair were added to the National Register of Historic Places in 1987.

References

Churches in Dallas County, Alabama
Churches completed in 1898
Christian Church (Disciples of Christ) congregations
Houses in Dallas County, Alabama
Houses completed in 1898
National Register of Historic Places in Dallas County, Alabama
Churches on the National Register of Historic Places in Alabama
1898 establishments in Alabama